José Manuel Albentosa Ferrer (born January 21, 1964 in Alicante) is a retired long-distance runner from Spain. He represented his native country in the men's 10.000 metres at the 1988 Summer Olympics in Seoul, South Korea.

Achievements

References

External links

Spanish Olympic Committee

1964 births
Living people
Spanish male long-distance runners
Athletes (track and field) at the 1988 Summer Olympics
Olympic athletes of Spain